Metylophorus nebulosus is a species of Psocoptera from the Psocidae family that can be found in Great Britain and Ireland. They can also be found in Albania, Austria, Belgium, Bulgaria, Croatia, Denmark, Finland, France, Germany, Greece, Hungary, Italy, Latvia, Luxembourg, Norway, Poland, Portugal, Romania, Spain, Sweden, Switzerland, and the Netherlands. The species are either black or brown coloured.

Habitat
The species feed on beech, birch, bird cherry, blackthorn, broom, elder, elm, field maple, holm oak, pine, sallow, sea buckthorn, spruce, and yew. It also likes to feed on apples.

References

Psocidae
Insects described in 1836
Psocoptera of Europe